Robert Lewis Burns Jr. (November 24, 1950 – April 3, 2015) was an American drummer in the original line-up of the Southern rock band Lynyrd Skynyrd.

Biography 
Burns was born in Gainesville, Florida, on November 24, 1950. He helped to form Lynyrd Skynyrd in 1964 with Ronnie Van Zant, Gary Rossington, Allen Collins and Larry Junstrom and remained until 1974, although by some accounts he left the band for a while during the early 1970s. Burns played on the band's early recordings, but on the album Skynyrd's First and... Last, a collection of early demos made in Muscle Shoals, the drum parts of some songs recorded in 1971 were played by Rickey Medlocke. That album also contains songs recorded in 1972 which feature Burns on drums, suggesting that Burns left the band in 1971 and had returned by 1972. During a brief period in the early 1970s, Medlocke occasionally played alongside Burns on drums for live shows, a two-drummer line-up similar to The Allman Brothers Band.

In addition to Skynyrd's First And... Last, Burns played on the band's first two official albums:  (Pronounced 'Lĕh-'nérd 'Skin-'nérd) and Second Helping. He had a mental breakdown while on a European tour and left the band in 1974.

In 1996, after several years of his public disappearance since the departure, he participated in a performance to promote Freebird: The Movie. On March 13, 2006, he rejoined Lynyrd Skynyrd for one performance as he played alongside Gary Rossington, Billy Powell, Ed King, Artimus Pyle and The Honkettes at the Rock and Roll Hall of Fame induction. But since then, he already disappeared from public attention once again until his death.

Death 
Burns died on April 3, 2015, in a single car crash after hitting a mailbox and tree on a sharp curve in Cartersville, Georgia, shortly after leaving his home.

References

External links 

1950 births
2015 deaths
American rock drummers
Lynyrd Skynyrd members
Musicians from Jacksonville, Florida
Road incident deaths in Georgia (U.S. state)
Blues rock musicians